The Autostrada A21 is an Italian motorway, which connects Turin to Brescia, through the Po Valley and the city of Piacenza.

Incidents
On 2 January 2018 a French car was rear-ended near Brescia by a lorry and collided in turn with a tanker ahead of it. The tanker exploded, six people died.

External links 
 S.A.T.A.P. S.p.A.
 Autostrade Centro Padane S.p.A.
 Structures on A 21 (E70): Torino - Brescia (Autostrada "dei Vini")

References

Autostrade in Italy
Transport in Piedmont
Transport in Emilia-Romagna
Transport in Lombardy
1968 establishments in Italy